In Ohio, State Route 75 may refer to:
Interstate 75 in Ohio, the only Ohio highway numbered 75 since about 1962
Ohio State Route 75 (1923), now SR 93 (Ironton to West Lafayette) and SR 751 (West Lafayette to Stone Creek)